FK Klaipėdos Granitas was a Lithuanian football club from Klaipėda.

 
Association football clubs established in 2012
Football clubs in Klaipėda
Defunct football clubs in Lithuania
2016 disestablishments in Lithuania
Association football clubs disestablished in 2016
2012 establishments in Lithuania